Aliabad-e Shur may refer to:
 Aliabad-e Shur, Fars
 Aliabad-e Shur, Khalilabad, Razavi Khorasan Province
 Aliabad-e Shur, Sabzevar, Razavi Khorasan Province